Habbo Siebold "Hayke" Veldman (born 5 November 1969) is a Dutch politician, he was a member of the House of Representatives of the Netherlands for the People's Party for Freedom and Democracy from 25 June 2014 until 30 March 2021.

Life
Veldman was born on 5 November 1969 in Zoetermeer.  After attending high school in Rosmalen, he proceeded to study history at the Radboud University Nijmegen between 1989 and 1995. Veldman worked as a policy worker for the municipalities of Geldermalsen, Eindhoven, Arnhem and Helmond between 1996 and 2010. He was member of the municipal council of Nijmegen from 16 March 2006 until 9 July 2014. On 25 June 2014 he entered the House of Representatives when he replaced Pieter Litjens, who became alderman in Amsterdam. His term in office ended 23 March 2017. He re-entered the House on 31 October 2017. During the COVID-19 pandemic in the Netherlands he was party spokesperson for the issue.

References

1969 births
Living people
People from Zoetermeer
Radboud University Nijmegen alumni
People's Party for Freedom and Democracy politicians
Municipal councillors of Nijmegen
Members of the House of Representatives (Netherlands)
21st-century Dutch politicians